Xenocona pulchra is a species of beetle in the family Cerambycidae, the only species in the genus Xenocona.

References

Acanthocinini